Rachid Kram is an Algerian Olympic middle-distance runner. He represented his country in the men's 1500 meters at the 1988 Summer Olympics. His time was a 3:39.90 in the first heat, and a 3:41.39 in the semifinals. He established the Algerian record in the 1500m in Verona Italy on July 27, 1988 with the time of 3:36:26. He was the Algerian champion for several years between 1982 and 1992.

References

1963 births
Living people
Algerian male middle-distance runners
Olympic athletes of Algeria
Athletes (track and field) at the 1988 Summer Olympics
21st-century Algerian people
20th-century Algerian people